The Ronda de Atocha is a thoroughfare in Madrid, Spain. It is part of the rim of streets rounding up the city historical centre, following the layout of the Walls of Philip IV.

History and description 
The Ronda occupies part of the layout of the ancient Walls of Philip IV.

Following the end of the 1936–1939 Spanish Civil War, during the Francoist dictatorship, the name of the Ronda de Atocha was changed to "General Primo de Rivera", in reference to Miguel Primo de Rivera. After 1968, the thoroughfare featured one of the three overpasses of so-called "scalextric" of Atocha, that infamously became one of the largest hotspots of air pollution in the entire city.

On 25 January 1980, during the municipal government of Enrique Tierno Galván, the City Council voted in favour of returning the name of the thoroughfare back to "Ronda de Atocha" along a wider change of another 26 street names connected to the Francoist dictatorship or the Civil War. Meanwhile, the dismantling of the "scalextric" started in 1985. Works were completed in 1986.

References 
Informational notes

Citations

Bibliography
 
 
 
 
 

Streets in Madrid
Embajadores neighborhood, Madrid
Arganzuela